The eastern buzzard or Japanese buzzard  (Buteo japonicus) is a medium to large bird of prey that is sometimes considered a subspecies of the widespread common buzzard (Buteo buteo). Some scientists treated is as a distinct species starting in 2008, but others still treat it as either one or three subspecies. It is native to Mongolia, China, Japan and some offshore islands. At least some birds winter in Southeast Asia. It is similar to the steppe buzzard.

It includes four subspecies:
B. j. burmanicus: breeds in Siberia, Mongolia, northern China, and North Korea, winters in Southeast Asia
B. j. japonicus: breeds only in Japan, winters from southern Japan to southeastern China and Taiwan
B. j. toyoshimai: Izu Islands and Bonin Islands
B. j. oshiroi: Daito Islands

References

 Clements, J. F., T. S. Schulenberg, M. J. Iliff, B.L. Sullivan, C. L. Wood, and D. Roberson. 2011. The Clements checklist of birds of the world: Version 6.6. Downloaded from https://web.archive.org/web/20100821172048/http://www.birds.cornell.edu/clementschecklist/downloadable-clements-checklist

Buteo
Birds of prey
Birds of China
Birds of Japan
Birds described in 1844